Joseph Dieudonné Alexis Chantraine (16 March 1901, in Bressoux, Belgium – 24 April 1987, in Liège) was a Belgian footballer.

An outside-right for Royal FC Liegeois, he played 382 matches there, and he was selected for the first World Cup in 1930, but did not play.

References

External links
 

Belgian footballers
1930 FIFA World Cup players
RFC Liège players
Belgian football managers
RFC Liège managers
1901 births
Footballers from Liège
1987 deaths
Association football midfielders